My Dead Ex is an American series which is produced by AwesomenessTV and airs on go90. The series premiered at South by Southwest in 2018 before being airing on Tumblr and go90 starting on March 20.

Plot
Charley is a normal high school girl with a crush on a cute boy. As she tries to score a date with the cute boy named Luke, her annoying ex, Ben Bloom, will do anything to get her to go on a date with him. Ever since she dumped him, she wanted nothing to do with him, but when he dies, things start to change.

Cast
 Katherine Hughes as Charley
 Ryan Lee as Ben
 Medalion Rahimi as Wren
 Ryan Malaty as Luke
 Marc Evan Jackson as Vice Principal Kelly
 Beth Littleford as Laurel
 Audrey Wasilewski as Mary Bloom
 Matt Braunger as Officer Mitch Maloof

Episodes

References

External links
 
 website

2018 American television series debuts
2018 American television series endings
2010s American high school television series
2010s American teen sitcoms
Awesomeness (company)
English-language television shows
Television series about teenagers
Television shows set in the United States
Zombies in television
Zombie web series